Vyacheslav Nikolayevich Vorobyov (born 27 November 1962) is a former Russian football player.

References

1962 births
Living people
Soviet footballers
FC Chernomorets Novorossiysk players
FC SKA Rostov-on-Don players
FC Kuban Krasnodar players
PFC Krylia Sovetov Samara players
Russian footballers
FC KAMAZ Naberezhnye Chelny players
Russian Premier League players
Association football defenders
FC Tighina players